In Christianity, agape is "the highest form of love, charity" and "the love of God for man and of man for God". This is in contrast to philia, brotherly love, or philautia, self-love, as it embraces a deep and profound sacrificial love that transcends and persists regardless of circumstance. The verb form goes as far back as Homer, translated literally as affection, as in "greet with affection" and "show affection for the dead". Other ancient authors have used forms of the word to denote love of a spouse or family, or affection for a particular activity, in contrast to eros (an affection of a sexual nature).

In the New Testament, it refers to the covenant love of God for humans, as well as the human reciprocal love for God; the term necessarily extends to the love of one's fellow human beings. Some contemporary writers have sought to extend the use of agape into non-religious contexts.
 
The concept of agape has been widely examined within its Christian context. It has also been considered in the contexts of other religions, religious ethics, and science.

Early uses
There are few instances of the word agape in polytheistic Greek literature. Bauer's Lexicon mentions a sepulchral inscription, most likely to honor a polytheistic army officer held in "high esteem" by his country.

Christianity 

The word agape received a broader usage under later Christian writers as the word that specifically denoted Christian love or charity, or even God himself. The expression "God is love" (ὁ θεὸς ἀγάπη ἐστίν) occurs twice in the New Testament: 1 John . Agape was also used by the early Christians to refer to the self-sacrificing love of God for humanity, which they were committed to reciprocating and practicing towards God and among one another (see kenosis). This understanding is built upon the foundational Hebrew concept of Chesed, or the loving kindness of God, which is taught throughout the Old Testament.

Agape has been expounded on by many Christian writers in a specifically Christian context. C. S. Lewis uses agape in The Four Loves to describe what he believes is the highest level of love known to humanity: a selfless love that is passionately committed to the well-being of others.

The Christian use of the term comes directly from the canonical Gospels' accounts of the teachings of Jesus. When asked what was the great commandment, "Jesus said unto him, Thou shalt love the Lord thy God with all thy heart, and with all thy soul, and with all thy mind. This is the first and great commandment. And the second is like unto it, Thou shalt love thy neighbour as thyself. On these two commandments hang all the law and the prophets."

In the Sermon on the Mount, Jesus said:

Tertullian remarks in his 2nd century defense of Christians that Christian love attracted pagan notice: "What marks us in the eyes of our enemies is our loving kindness. 'Only look,' they say, 'look how they love one another' " (Apology 39).

Anglican theologian O. C. Quick writes that this agape within human experience is "a very partial and rudimentary realization," and that "in its pure form it is essentially divine."

In the New Testament, the word agape is often used to describe God's love. However, other forms of the word are used in an accusatory context, such as the various forms of the verb agapaō. Examples include:

 — "for Demas hath forsaken me, having loved [agapēsas] this present world...".
 — "For they loved [ēgapēsan] the praise of men more than the praise of God."
 — "And this is the condemnation, that light is come into the world, and men loved [ēgapēsan] darkness rather than light, because their deeds were evil."

Karl Barth distinguishes agape from eros on the basis of its origin and depth of devotion without want. In agape, humanity does not merely express its nature, but transcends it. Agape identifies with the interests of the neighbor "in utter independence of the question of his attractiveness" and with no expectation of reciprocity.

Meal

The word agape is used in its plural form (agapai) in the New Testament to describe a meal or feast eaten by early Christians, as in Jude  and 2nd Peter . The agape love feast is still observed by many Christian denominations today, especially among Brethren and other Plain, Anabaptist churches. For example, among the Old Order River Brethren and Old Brethren, a weekend is still set aside twice a year for special meetings, self examination and a communal Love Feast as part of their three-part Communion observance.

As law

According to 1 Timothy, agape that "comes out of a pure heart, and of good conscience and of faith unfeigned" is the "end of the commandment". The contrast with the law is only that "law is good, if a man use it lawfully". Only, the biblical author cautions: "Some having swerved have turned aside unto vain jangling. Desiring to be teachers of the law; understanding neither what they say, nor whereof they affirm". This is because "the law is not made for a righteous man, but for the lawless and disobedient".

Romans 13 teaches then that "love is the fulfillment of the law" referencing the "armor of light" (see Armor of God), which becomes the foundation for the Miles Christianus: "let us therefore cast off the works of darkness, and let us put on the armor of light".

See also

Judaism
 Jewish views on love
 Chesed, Hebrew word, given the association of kindness and love
 Sephirot of Kabbalah
 Dveikut

Other religions
 Mettā, Pali word (Sanskrit: Maitrī), "loving-kindness" or "friendliness"
 Ishq, Arabic word, "divine love" or "lustless love"
 Ren, the sense of "humaneness" in Confucianism

References

Further reading 
 Drummond, Henry (1884). "The Greatest Thing in the World". Address first delivered in Northfield, England.
 Hein, David. "Christianity and Honor." The Living Church, August 18, 2013, pp. 8–10.
 
 

 
 Outka, Gene H. (1972). Agape: An Ethical Analysis. Description & Contents. Yale University Press.

External links 

 "Agape" at Balashon—Hebrew Language Detective
 Deus Caritas Est—Former Pope Benedict XVI's 2005 encyclical letter contrasts agape and eros

Christian practices
Magic words
New Testament Greek words and phrases
Philosophy of love
Thelema